Ch'ên Shou-yi (1899–1978) was a Chinese-American literary historian and cultural studies scholar. He is known for his contributions to the comparative cultural studies of China and the West. He was a professor at Pomona College in Claremont, California from 1941 to 1967.

Early life and education 
Chen was born in 1899 to a well-known literati family in Panyu, Guangdong, China, and received a traditional Confucian education before college. He completed his undergraduate studies at Canton Christian College in Guangzhou in 1920 and earned his doctorate in comparative literature from the University of Chicago in 1929.

Career 
In the 1920s, Chen was influential in the New Culture Movement under Hu Shih.

Chen was the chair of the history department at Peking University in Beijing from 1931 to 1937. In 1936, he took a sabbatical as a visiting professor at Pomona College in Claremont, California, but upon his return to China was confronted with the Second Sino-Japanese War.

Chen took a position at the University of Hawaiʻi at Mānoa in 1937. In 1941, he returned to Pomona as a professor, a position he held until his retirement in 1967.

In 1961, Chen published Chinese LIterature: A Historical Introduction (Ronald Press), the second English language survey of Chinese literature after Herbert Giles' 1901 A History of Chinese Literature. Academic reviewers praised the work's wide breadth and attempt to fill a hole in the academic literature, but many criticized its lack of scholarly analysis and poor editing.

Later life and death 
Chen retired in 1967, but kept going to his office each day to continue his research. He died of illness in 1978. His family donated his papers to the Claremont Colleges' library, where they are kept in the special collections department.

Recognition and legacy 
Chen received widespread recognition for his scholarly work. He was elected a member of Academia Sinica, the highest honor given to academics in the Republic of China.

Chen is credited with helping to develop the Asian studies programs at Pomona and the other Claremont Colleges.

Notes

References

External links 

 Ch'en (Shou-yi) Papers at The Claremont Colleges Library
 Chen Shou-yi collection at the Archives of the Institute of Taiwan History, Academia Sinica 
 

1899 births
Lingnan University (Guangzhou) alumni
University of Chicago alumni
Academic staff of Lingnan University (Guangzhou)
Academic staff of Peking University
University of Hawaiʻi at Mānoa faculty
Pomona College faculty
Literary historians
Chinese literary critics
Chinese sinologists
People from Panyu District
1978 deaths
Members of Academia Sinica
American academics of Chinese descent
Chinese emigrants to the United States